Darren Yapp (born 19 February 1975) is an English former rugby union footballer. He primarily played as a centre and on the wing. Yapp came through the amateur club Thornbury, before joining Bristol in 1996 after the game went professional. He moved from Bristol to Connacht in 2000 and spent the remainder of his career there.

Yapp featured 15 times for Bristol in the 1997–98 Premiership, as the team were relegated. He also played three games in the 1997–98 European Challenge Cup. The team spent the 1998–99 season in the Premiership Two but were promoted as champions, returning to the top flight for the 1999–2000 season.

In 2000, Yapp joined Irish provincial side Connacht. He played in the Irish Interprovincial Championship and the Challenge Cup in his first season. The 2001–02 season saw the foundation of the Celtic League, which replaced the Interprovincial series as the domestic competition for the Irish sides. For the remainder of his professional career, Yapp played in the Celtic League and the Challenge Cup. His performances for Connacht earned him a call up to the  training squad in 2004. Yapp made his 100th appearance for Connacht on 12 May 2006 against Neath-Swansea Ospreys.

In April 2008, having played 162 times for Connacht, Yapp announced that he would retire at the end of the season. He played two more games for the side, with his final appearance coming at home to Ospreys on the final day of the season.

2009 he stepped into help coach Bristol Aerospace company RFC work on attack and backs alongside the gift forward coach Mike Casper Underwood .

Darren is now a 2023 GEM award winner.

References

1975 births
Living people
Bristol Bears players
Connacht Rugby players
Rugby union players from Wolverhampton